Lieutenant-Colonel John Stanhope Collings-Wells VC DSO (19 July 1880 – 27 March 1918) was an English recipient of the Victoria Cross, the highest and most prestigious award for gallantry in the face of the enemy that can be awarded to British and Commonwealth forces. He was educated at Uppingham School and Christ Church, Oxford, where he joined the Apollo University Lodge.

Born in Manchester on 19 July 1880 to Arthur & Caroline Mary, Collings-Wells moved to Marple to live with his cousin, Will Buck, enabling him to run his father's business in Manchester.

Collings-Wells was commissioned into the 4th (Hertfordshire Militia) Battalion, Bedfordshire Regiment on 17 September 1904 and promoted to captain on 3 January 1907. The part-time Militia was converted into the Special Reserve in 1908, with the role of providing reinforcements for the Regular Army in time of war. After World War I war broke out in 1914, Collings-Wells went to France as a reinforcement for the 2nd (Regular) Battalion of the Bedfords on 6 November 1914. He was wounded on 12 January 1915 and evacuated to the UK. He was promoted to temporary Major on 30 January 1916 and was serving as commander of A Company in 4th (Extra Reserve) Battalion, Bedfordshire Regiment when it landed in France in July 1916. Collings-Wells became second-in-command of the battalion on 4 September and took over command of the battalion as acting Lieutenant-Colonel on 20 October 1916.

Collings-Wells was awarded the Distinguished Service Order in 1917 for his command of the battalion during the Second Battle of the Scarpe, when it captured and held the northern outskirts of Gavrelle on 23 April 1917. Further, on 29 April he commanded a composite battalion of 4th Bedfords and 7th (Extra Reserve) Battalion, Royal Fusiliers in the Battle of Arleux when it attacked and captured the Oppy line. He was also mentioned in dispatches in November 1917.

VC Citation
In the period 22/27 March during the fighting from Marcoing to Albert, France, while commanding 4th Bedfords he committed acts which earned him the Victoria Cross. He died in action on 27 March 1918.

He was buried at Bouzincourt Ridge Cemetery (Plot 3, Row E, Grave 12). His Victoria Cross is displayed at the Bedfordshire and Hertfordshire Regimental Collection at the Wardown Park Museum, Luton, Bedfordshire.

References

Monuments to Courage (David Harvey, 1999)
The Register of the Victoria Cross (This England, 1997)
VCs of the First World War - Spring Offensive 1918 (Gerald Gliddon, 1997)

External links
 

1880 births
1918 deaths
Military personnel from Manchester
British World War I recipients of the Victoria Cross
British Army personnel of World War I
British military personnel killed in World War I
Hertfordshire Militia officers
Bedfordshire and Hertfordshire Regiment officers
Companions of the Distinguished Service Order
People educated at Uppingham School
British Army recipients of the Victoria Cross
Burials in France
Freemasons of the United Grand Lodge of England